Gresufes is a Portuguese hamlet in the parish of Balasar, Póvoa de Varzim. Its name is of Suebi origin.

Gresufes was a parish until 1442, when it merged with the neighbouring parish of Casal to form Balasar, named after a small place in the area. Alexandrina Maria da Costa was born in Gresufes. 

Villages in Portugal